In mathematics, the Hankel transform expresses any given function f(r) as the weighted sum of an infinite number of Bessel functions of the first kind . The Bessel functions in the sum are all of the same order ν, but differ in a scaling factor k along the r axis. The necessary coefficient  of each Bessel function in the sum, as a function of the scaling factor k constitutes the transformed function. The Hankel transform is an integral transform and was first developed by the mathematician Hermann Hankel. It is also known as the Fourier–Bessel transform. Just as the Fourier transform for an infinite interval is related to the Fourier series over a finite interval, so the Hankel transform over an infinite interval is related to the Fourier–Bessel series over a finite interval.

Definition
The Hankel transform of order   of a function f(r) is given by

 

 

which can be readily verified using the orthogonality relationship described below.

Domain of definition
Inverting a Hankel transform of a function f(r) is valid at every point at which f(r) is continuous, provided that the function is defined in (0, ∞), is piecewise continuous and of bounded variation in every finite subinterval in (0, ∞), and

 

However, like the Fourier transform, the domain can be extended by a density argument to include some functions whose above integral is not finite, for example .

Alternative definition
An alternative definition says that the Hankel transform of g(r) is

 

The two definitions are related:
 If , then 
This means that, as with the previous definition, the Hankel transform defined this way is also its own inverse:
 
The obvious domain now has the condition
 
but this can be extended. According to the reference given above, we can take the integral as the limit as the upper limit goes to infinity (an improper integral rather than a Lebesgue integral), and in this way the Hankel transform and its inverse work for all functions in L2(0, ∞).

Transforming Laplace's equation 
The Hankel transform can be used to transform and solve Laplace's equation expressed in cylindrical coordinates. In the axisymmetric case, the partial differential equation is transformed as

 

which is an ordinary differential equation in the transformed variable .

Orthogonality
The Bessel functions form an orthogonal basis with respect to the weighting factor r:

The Plancherel theorem and Parseval's theorem

 

Parseval's theorem, which states

 

is a special case of the Plancherel theorem.  These theorems can be proven using the orthogonality property.

Relation to the multidimensional Fourier transform 
The Hankel transform appears when one writes the multidimensional Fourier transform in hyperspherical coordinates, which is the reason why the Hankel transform often appears in physical problems with cylindrical or spherical symmetry.

Consider a function  of a -dimensional vector .

Special cases

Fourier transform in two dimensions 
If a two-dimensional function  is expanded in a multipole series,

Fourier transform in three dimensions 
If a three-dimensional function  is expanded in a multipole series over spherical harmonics,

This kind of Hankel transform of half-integer order is also known as the spherical Bessel transform.

Fourier transform in  dimensions (radially symmetric case) 

2D functions inside a limited radius

If a two-dimensional function  is expanded in a multipole series and the expansion coefficients  are sufficiently smooth near the origin and zero outside a radius , the radial part  may be expanded into a power series of :

such that the two-dimensional Fourier transform of  becomes

where the last equality follows from §6.567.1 of. The expansion coefficients  are accessible with discrete Fourier transform techniques: if the radial distance is scaled with

the Fourier-Chebyshev series coefficients  emerge as

Using the re-expansion

This is one flavor of fast Hankel transform techniques.

Relation to the Fourier and Abel transforms
The Hankel transform is one member of the FHA cycle of integral operators.

 

In other words, applying the Abel transform to a 1-dimensional function and then applying the Fourier transform to that result is the same as applying the Hankel transform to that function. This concept can be extended to higher dimensions.

Numerical evaluation 
A simple and efficient approach to the numerical evaluation of the Hankel transform is based on the observation that it can be cast in the form of a convolution by a logarithmic change of variables

In these new variables, the Hankel transform reads

where

Now the integral can be calculated numerically with  complexity using fast Fourier transform. The algorithm can be further simplified by using a known analytical expression for the Fourier transform of :

This algorithm is known as the "quasi-fast Hankel transform", or simply "fast Hankel transform".

Since it is based on fast Fourier transform in logarithmic variables,  has to be defined on a logarithmic grid. For functions defined on a uniform grid, a number of other algorithms exist, including straightforward quadrature, methods based on the projection-slice theorem, and methods using the asymptotic expansion of Bessel functions.

Some Hankel transform pairs 

 is a modified Bessel function of the second kind.
 is the complete elliptic integral of the first kind.

The expression
 
coincides with the expression for the Laplace operator in polar coordinates  applied to a spherically symmetric function 

The Hankel transform of Zernike polynomials are essentially Bessel Functions (Noll 1976):

 

for even .

See also

 Fourier transform
 Integral transform
 Abel transform
 Fourier–Bessel series
 Neumann polynomial
 Y and H transforms

References 

 
 
 
 
 

 

 

 

Integral transforms